The Michigan Republican Party is the state affiliate of the national Republican Party in Michigan, sometimes referred to as MIGOP. Ronald Weiser was elected chairman in 2021.

Ronna Romney McDaniel was the chairwoman of the party, having been elected in 2015 by delegates to the Republican State Convention. McDaniel is now the Republican National Committee Chairwoman. The Michigan Republican Party hosts a biennial political conference at the Mackinac Island Grand Hotel called the Mackinac Republican Leadership Conference. The event features notable national Republicans, senators, governors, and presidential candidates.

Whereas the Michigan Republican Party has historically been characterized by moderate conservatism, the party took a hard-right turn after Donald Trump won the presidency in 2016. After the 2020 United States elections, the Michigan Republican Party pushed false claims of fraud and sought to overturn the election results. A months-long Republican investigation found there was no evidence of widespread fraud and recommended for the attorney general to investigate some who had made such allegations for personal gain.

Starting in 2023 and as a result of the 2022 elections, the party has no substantial political power in the state. The Republican Party has minorities in both chambers of the state legislature and its U.S. House delegation, as well as neither of the state's U.S. Senate seats, and no statewide executive offices.

History
Republicans have been elected to the governorship of Michigan in 27 of 48 gubernatorial elections. The first was Kingsley S. Bingham in 1855, and the most recent is Rick Snyder, who was elected in 2010, and then re-elected in 2014.

After President Richard Nixon resigned due to the Watergate scandal, Vice-President Gerald Ford became the 38th President of the United States. Ford grew up in Grand Rapids and served as a U.S. Representative from Michigan from 1949 to 1973.

Following the 2016 election and Reince Priebus' selection to be White House Chief of Staff, Michigan Republican Party Chairman Ronna Romney McDaniel became Chairwoman of the Republican National Committee. Then President-elect Trump recommended McDaniel in December 2016 to replace Priebus. She was officially elected as RNC chair on January 19, 2017, becoming the second woman to hold the post in RNC history, after Mary Louise Smith.

After Joe Biden won the 2020 presidential election in Michigan and Donald Trump refused to concede, the Michigan Republican Party pushed false claims of fraud and sought to overturn the election results. In January 2021, the Michigan Republican Party sought to replace GOP member Aaron Van Langevelde on the Michigan Board of Canvassers; he had previously voted to certify the Michigan election results in favor of Biden. One of the candidates that the Michigan Republican Party sought to nominate to that position was Linda Lee Tarver, who had been involved in efforts to overturn the election results.

According to the Associated Press, since Trump's defeat in the 2020 presidential election and Michigan swinging back to the Democrats, the Michigan GOP have taken a hard right-wing turn. The shift has altered the once moderate character of the state GOP and has instead embraced more right-wing elements. In 2021, the executive director of the Michigan GOP resigned after he declined to say that the 2020 election was stolen from Donald Trump; delegates in the Michigan GOP had called for him to be fired for his remarks.

Current elected Republicans in Michigan

Members of Congress

U.S. Senate
 None

Both of Michigan's U.S. Senate seats have been held by Democrats since 2000. Spencer Abraham was the last Republican to represent Michigan in the U.S. Senate. First elected in 1994, Abraham lost his bid for a second term in 2000 to Democrat Debbie Stabenow who has held the seat since.

U.S. House of Representatives
Out of the 13 seats Michigan is apportioned in the U.S. House of Representatives, 6 are held by Republicans:

Statewide
 None

Michigan has not elected any GOP candidates to statewide office since 2014, when Rick Snyder, Brian Calley, Bill Schuette, and Ruth Johnson were re-elected as governor, lieutenant governor, attorney general, and secretary of state, respectively. In 2018, term limits prevented all four politicians from seeking third terms. Schuette ran as the Republican nominee in the 2018 gubernatorial election with Lisa Posthumus Lyons as his running mate and was subsequently defeated by Democratic challenger Gretchen Whitmer and running mate Garlin Gilchrist while Tom Leonard and Mary Treder Lang ran as the Republican nominees for Attorney General and Secretary of State and were subsequently defeated by Democratic challengers Dana Nessel and Jocelyn Benson.

Michigan Legislature
Senate Minority Leader: Aric Nesbitt

Senate Minority Floor Leader: Bryan Posthumus

House Minority Leader: Matt Hall

United States cabinet members from Michigan who served under a Republican president
The following are in order of presidential succession.

Michigan Republican State Committee
The Michigan Republican State Committee is the state central committee of the Michigan Republican Party. It is composed of seven members from each of Michigan's Congressional district Republican committees, the Chairman, Co-Chairman, the various Vice Chairmen of the Party, and the Secretary, Treasurer and General and Financial Counsels. It selects Michigan's two representatives to the Republican National Committee. Additionally, the Chairperson of each County Republican Party organization is a non-voting ex officio member of the State Committee.

Current leadership
Ronald Weiser - Chairman

Meshawn Maddock - Co-Chair

- National Committeewoman

- National Committeeman

Paul Stephens - Youth Vice Chairman

Diane Schindlbeck - Administrative Vice Chairman

Tami Carlone - Coalitions Vice Chairman

Bernadette Smith - Ethnic Vice Chairman

Marian Sheridan - Grassroots Vice Chairwoman

Tyrell Bundy - Outreach Vice Chairman

2021 District Chairs list

Chairmen of the Michigan Republican State Committee

References

External links

Michigan Republican Party
Michigan Young Republicans
Mackinac Republican Leadership Conference
Michigan Republican Party District Chairs 2021 list
Michigan Republican Wayne County organizations

Republican Party
Republican Party (United States) by state
Political parties established in 1854
1854 establishments in Michigan